Thomas Radcliffe (1715 – 24 January 1776) was an Irish politician.

He was the Member of Parliament for St Canice in the Irish House of Commons between 1774 and his death in 1776.

References

1715 births
1776 deaths
Irish MPs 1769–1776
Members of the Parliament of Ireland (pre-1801) for County Kilkenny constituencies